Christoffer Kongsted Remmer (born 16 January 1993) is a Danish professional footballer who plays as a right-back for Danish 1st Division club SønderjyskE.

Club career

Copenhagen 
Remmer joined the first-team squad at Copenhagen in the beginning of 2012–13 season, together with Andreas Cornelius and Jakob Busk. Remmer was expected to become Lars Jacobsen's successor on the right back position.

Remmer gained his first Superliga match on 4 August 2012, when he was in the starting line-up against Esbjerg fB at Blue Water Arena in Esbjerg. 33 minutes into his debut, he assisted on Martin Vingaard's 1-0 goal.

Molde 
On 10 August 2016, Remmer signed a three-year contract with Norwegian Tippeligaen side Molde FK. He made his debut for the club in a 2–0 away win against Aalesund on 14 August 2016. On 23 May 2019, Remmer scored his first goal in his senior career in Molde's 4–0 win against Sunndal in the Norwegian Cup second round.

Westerlo 
On 16 July 2019, it was confirmed that Remmer had moved to Belgian club Westerlo on a three-year contract.

SønderjyskE
On 7 June 2022, Remmer returned to his homeland, when he joined newly relegated Danish 1st Division club SønderjyskE on a deal until June 2024.

Career statistics

Honours
Copenhagen
Danish Superliga: 2012–13, 2015–16
Danish Cup: 2014–15, 2015–16
Westerlo

 Belgian First Division B: 2021–22

References

External links 
  F.C. Copenhagen profile
  National team profile

1993 births
Danish men's footballers
Danish expatriate men's footballers
Living people
People from Hvidovre Municipality
Denmark youth international footballers
Denmark under-21 international footballers
Association football defenders
F.C. Copenhagen players
K.V.C. Westerlo players
Molde FK players
SønderjyskE Fodbold players
Danish Superliga players
Eliteserien players
Challenger Pro League players
Expatriate footballers in Norway
Expatriate footballers in Belgium
Danish expatriate sportspeople in Norway
Danish expatriate sportspeople in Belgium
Sportspeople from the Capital Region of Denmark